Anthene kimboza is a butterfly in the family Lycaenidae. It is found in Kenya (the Arabuko-Sokoke Forest) and north-eastern Tanzania. The habitat consists of forests at altitudes of about 500 metres.

The length of the forewings is about 10.2 mm. The upperside of the wings is brown and the underside of the forewings is pale brown with dark brown markings.

References

Butterflies described in 1990
Anthene